Hendrik Keemink (16 December 1902 – 7 June 1985) was a Dutch racewalker. He competed in the men's 10 kilometres walk at the 1924 Summer Olympics.

References

External links
 

1902 births
1985 deaths
Athletes (track and field) at the 1924 Summer Olympics
Dutch male racewalkers
Olympic athletes of the Netherlands
Place of birth missing